Joachim Dreifke (born 26 December 1952) is a German rower who competed for East Germany in the 1976 Summer Olympics and in the 1980 Summer Olympics.

He was born in Greifswald. In 1976 he won the bronze medal in the Olympic single sculls event. Four years later he and his partner Klaus Kröppelien won the gold medal in the Olympic double sculls competition.

References

External links
 

1952 births
Living people
People from Greifswald
People from Bezirk Rostock
East German male rowers
Sportspeople from Mecklenburg-Western Pomerania
Olympic rowers of East Germany
Rowers at the 1976 Summer Olympics
Rowers at the 1980 Summer Olympics
Olympic gold medalists for East Germany
Olympic bronze medalists for East Germany
Olympic medalists in rowing
World Rowing Championships medalists for East Germany
Medalists at the 1980 Summer Olympics
Medalists at the 1976 Summer Olympics
Recipients of the Patriotic Order of Merit in gold